Pseudonocardia rhizophila is a bacterium from the genus of Pseudonocardia which has been isolated from rhizosphere soil from the plant Tripterygium wilfordii in Yunnan in China.

References

Pseudonocardia
Bacteria described in 2012